The Secular Scripture: A Study of the Structure of Romance is a collection of essays by the Canadian literary critic Northrop Frye. The collection was originally published in 1976. It has been reviewed by E. D. Blodgett, Harold Bloom, John P. Brennan, M. W. Copeland, L. S. Dembo, Lynn Dickerson, A. C. Hamilton, Carl Lindahl, Mavor Moore, William Nelson, Barbara Nelson Sargent, Luis Ellicott Yglesias, and an anonymous reviewer.

References

1976 books
Books by Northrop Frye
Harvard University Press  books
Canadian non-fiction books